Stress shielding refers to the reduction in bone density (osteopenia) as a result of removal of typical stress from the bone by an implant (for instance, the femoral component of a hip prosthesis). This is because by Wolff's law, bone in a healthy person or animal will remodel in response to the loads it is placed under. Therefore, if the loading on a bone decreases, the bone will become less dense and weaker because there is no stimulus for continued remodeling that is required to maintain bone mass.

The design of porous implant is one typical method to alleviate the problem.

References

Orthopedic surgical procedures
Skeletal disorders